Yahaya bin Mat Nor is a Malaysian politician from AMANAH. He is the Member of Perak State Legislative Assembly for Pasir Panjang from 2018 to 2022.

Politics 
He is the Deputy Chairman of AMANAH Lumut Branch.

Election result

External links

Reference 

People from Perak
University of Malaya alumni
National Trust Party (Malaysia) politicians
Members of the Perak State Legislative Assembly
Malaysian people of Malay descent
Living people
Year of birth missing (living people)